Mette Tønder (born 3 November 1969) is a Norwegian politician for the Conservative Party.

She served as a deputy representative to the Parliament of Norway from Akershus during the term 2009–2013. She was the mayor of Nittedal from 2007 to 2011. In 2012 she became a member of Akershus University Hospital.

In 2013 she was elected as a full member of Parliament. She served as a member of the Standing Committee on Family and Cultural Affairs.

References

1969 births
Living people
People from Nittedal
Members of the Storting
Conservative Party (Norway) politicians
Mayors of places in Akershus
Women members of the Storting
21st-century Norwegian politicians
21st-century Norwegian women politicians
Women mayors of places in Norway